NGC 1278 is an elliptical galaxy located about 230 million light-years away in the constellation Perseus. NGC 1278 was discovered by astronomer Heinrich d'Arrest on February 14, 1863. It was then rediscovered by astronomer Guillaume Bigourdan on October 22, 1884 and was later listed as IC 1907. NGC 1278 is a member of the Perseus Cluster and is a low-luminosity AGN (LLAGN).

Globular clusters
Unlike the nearby galaxy NGC 1277 which has a dominant population of metal-rich or “red” globular clusters, NGC 1278 has a rich population of both metal-rich and metal-poor or “blue” globular clusters.

See also
 List of NGC objects (1001–2000)
 NGC 1275
 NGC 1277

References

External links

Perseus Cluster
Perseus (constellation)
Elliptical galaxies
Active galaxies
1278
012438 
02670
Astronomical objects discovered in 1863
IC objects